The 1956 United States presidential election in Montana took place on November 6, 1956 as part of the 1956 United States presidential election. Voters chose four representatives, or electors to the Electoral College, who voted for president and vice president.

Montana strongly voted for the Republican nominee, President Dwight D. Eisenhower, over the Democratic nominee, former Illinois Governor Adlai Stevenson. Eisenhower won Montana by 14.26%; however, owing to a five-year drought in the High Plains that resulted in a considerable protest vote for Stevenson, he did not do as well as had four years earlier.

However, his strong Catholic appeal meant that Eisenhower gained substantially in the heavily Irish mining counties of the west. In addition to that, this is the only election since 1924, as of 2020, in which neighboring Deer Lodge and Silver Bow counties voted for different candidates, the two normally being Democratic strongholds.

Results

Results by county

See also
 United States presidential elections in Montana

Notes

References

Montana
1956
1956 Montana elections